Munga-Thirri National Park, formerly known as the Simpson Desert National Park, is the largest national park in Queensland, Australia, 1,495 km west of Brisbane.

Landforms
The main features of the park are large sand dunes which can be 50 m high and around 1 km apart. Most dunes are between 10 and 35 m in height. The longest sand ridge is 200 km in length. One of the most prominent dunes is called 'Big Red' and is located 35 km west of Birdsville. The dunes started to form 30,000 years ago. Also found in the park are salt lakes and claypans.

Flora and fauna
The landscape supports up to 180 bird species.  The park includes part of the Simpson Desert Important Bird Area, identified as such by BirdLife International because it contains habitat suitable for Eyrean grasswrens.  Other animals which may be seen include the dingo, geckos and the feral camel. With the falling of any significant rains comes a transformation of dormant wildflowers.

Tourism
Visitors are encouraged to visit from April to October to avoid extreme daytime temperatures and to travel within a two-vehicle party with long distance communications equipment. A 4WD vehicle is needed to travel through the park. There are no roads in the park.  The main track is called the QAA Line. Winter mornings can be freezing, while summer temperatures can be as hot as 50°. Camping is permitted within 500 m of the QAA Line. Vehicles are not permitted to leave the main track.

Park rangers who are based at Birdsville occasionally close the park when flooded rivers pose a risk to tourists. Increasing tourist numbers have been depleting wood supplies to the point that native fauna could be affected. This has led to authorities encouraging the use of gas camp stoves.

History
Aboriginal peoples have lived in the region for generations.

David Lindsay was the first non-Aboriginal person to cross the central and southern areas of the Simpson Desert in 1886.  In 1936 Ted Colson crossed the full length of the desert.

A national park in the desert was first suggested in 1965 by the National Parks Association of Queensland. The park was extended northwards in 1991. The expansion included arid lands with a more diverse range of vegetation.

, the Head Ranger of the park is Elder of the Wangkangurru people and traditional owner Don Rowlands , residing in Birdsville.

See also

 Protected areas of Queensland
 Munga-Thirri—Simpson Desert Conservation Park
 Simpson Desert Important Bird Area
 Munga-Thirri–Simpson Desert Regional Reserve

References

National parks of Queensland
Protected areas established in 1967
Important Bird Areas of Queensland
1967 establishments in Australia
Shire of Diamantina